G. Hari (b 1964) is an Indian politician and Member of Parliament elected from Tamil Nadu. He is elected to the Lok Sabha from Arakkonam constituency as an Anna Dravida Munnetra Kazhagam candidate in 2014 election.

He is a practicing advocate at a Tiruthani court and as of 2014 he is the district secretary of the MGR Manram (Tiruthani North). He is a native of Kuppankadiagai village in Thiruvalangadu block near Tiruthani. He represented the party in Tamil Nadu Assembly as the Tiruthani MLA during 2006–2011.

Electoral performance

References 

All India Anna Dravida Munnetra Kazhagam politicians
Living people
India MPs 2014–2019
Lok Sabha members from Tamil Nadu
1964 births
Members of the Tamil Nadu Legislative Assembly
People from Tiruvallur district
Tamil Nadu politicians